Kurana (Village ID 119923) is a large size village in Hapur district of Uttar Pradesh, India. The village is around 65 Kilometers from Delhi, 12 km from Hapur and is situated on NH-335 Meerut-Agra Road. Nearest town is Gulaothi. According to the 2011 census it has a population of 4103 living in 590 households.

References

External links
Kurana at Wikimapia

Villages in Hapur district